Sagylium or Sagylion was a castle situated on a steep rock in the interior of ancient Pontus, which was one of the strongholds of the Pontian kings.

Its site is located near Kaletepe, Asiatic Turkey.

References

Populated places in ancient Pontus
Former populated places in Turkey
History of Samsun Province